George Washington's resignation as commander-in-chief marked the end of Washington's military service in the American Revolutionary War and his return to civilian life at Mount Vernon.

His voluntary action has been described as "one of the nation's great acts of statesmanship" and helped establish the precedent of civilian control of the military. After the Treaty of Paris ending the war had been signed on September 3, 1783, and after the last British troops left New York City on November 25, Washington resigned his commission as commander-in-chief of the Continental Army to the Congress of the Confederation, then meeting in the Maryland State House at Annapolis, Maryland, on December 23 of the same year. This followed his farewell to the Continental Army, November 2 at Rockingham near Princeton, New Jersey, and his farewell to his officers, December 4 at Fraunces Tavern in New York City.

Washington's resignation was depicted by John Trumbull in 1824 with the life-size painting, General George Washington Resigning His Commission, now on view in the United States Capitol rotunda.

History
Washington arrived at Annapolis on December 19, 1783, and was greeted by General William Smallwood and General Horatio Gates at the Three Mile Oak. The next day, he wrote to Congress about the method to resign, whether in person or by writing. The President of the Continental Congress, Thomas Mifflin, appointed a committee of Thomas Jefferson, James McHenry, and Elbridge Gerry to determine the details. On Monday, December 22, Congress honored Washington with a feast at Mann's Tavern, attended by between two and three hundred gentlemen. Later that night, a public ball was held in his honor by Maryland Governor William Paca at the State House. Nearly six hundred guests attended. Historian Willard Sterne Randall describes the evening: "George Washington, a famous dancer, astonished French officers with his skill and grace at the minuet."

At noon, on Tuesday, December 23, Charles Thomson, secretary of the Continental Congress, led Washington, accompanied by two of his aides-de-camp, Col. David Humphreys and Col. Benjamin Walker, into the Senate Chamber of the Maryland State House. While depicted in some paintings of the event, Martha Washington was not actually in attendance. Then Washington delivered his remarks to the assembly: 
As the last act of his resignation, Washington handed his commission and his speech to President Mifflin. The next day, December 24, Washington left for his residence, Mount Vernon.

Legacy
Historian Gordon S. Wood, the recipient of the 1993 Pulitzer Prize for History for The Radicalism of the American Revolution (1992), writes in his book: 

On May 3, 1797, King George III told the American painter Benjamin West his opinion of Washington (as reported by West to ambassador Rufus King): 

The American artist, John Trumbull, a former aide-de-camp to Washington, after receiving word of Washington's resignation, wrote to his brother Jonathan Trumbull Jr. that it:  Later, in describing his painting, General George Washington Resigning His Commission, Trumbull considered Washington's resignation "one of the highest moral lessons ever given to the world".

The historian Thomas Fleming described the significance of the event:

Artistic depictions
Washington's resignation has been depicted by several artists in both paintings and sculptures. Raimondo Trentanove carved a bas-relief of this scene on the pedestal of Antonio Canova's George Washington that was installed in the North Carolina State House in 1821. Both were destroyed by fire in 1831. Trumbull's 1824 life-size painting, General George Washington Resigning His Commission, can be seen in the United States Capitol rotunda. In 1829, the sculptor  completed the statue of Washington resigning his commission that is atop the Washington Monument in Baltimore. In 1840, Horatio Greenough completed his sculpture of Washington returning power to the people. It is now at the National Museum of American History. About 1841, Ferdinand Pettrich sculpted a painted plaster sculpture, Washington Resigning His Commission, now at the Smithsonian American Art Museum. In 1858, Edwin White painted Washington Resigning His Commission, on commission from the Maryland Legislature. It is on display in the Grand Staircase of the Maryland State House. In 1903, Edwin Blashfield created the mural, Washington Surrendering His Commission, which depicts Washington laying his commission at the feet of Columbia. It is located in the Clarence Mitchell Courthouse in Baltimore.

Gallery

See also

 List of George Washington articles
 Newburgh Conspiracy
 Newburgh letter

References

External links
 

1783 in the United States
American Revolutionary War
George Washington
Maryland in the American Revolution